Taweesak Kasiwat (born 10 August 1932) is a Thai former sports shooter. He competed at the 1964 Summer Olympics and the 1968 Summer Olympics.

References

External links
 
 ISSF Profile

1932 births
Living people
Taweesak Kasiwat
Taweesak Kasiwat
Shooters at the 1964 Summer Olympics
Shooters at the 1968 Summer Olympics
Taweesak Kasiwat
Asian Games medalists in shooting
Shooters at the 1966 Asian Games
Taweesak Kasiwat
Taweesak Kasiwat
Medalists at the 1966 Asian Games
Taweesak Kasiwat